Malden is a small unincorporated community in Armstrong County, Texas, United States. The community is part of the Amarillo, Texas Metropolitan Statistical Area.

History
Locals in Malden raise livestock and grow wheat. A local needle club in the community made quilts, bedspreads, and garments for the Red Cross during World War I. A local home demonstration club called the Malden Harmony Club was organized in 1927. Malden did not have a post office, or a population recorded, but it did report to have a population of 26 in 1940.

In 1995, Schweizer Aircraft sold the rights to the Ag Cat to Ag-Cat Corp. in Malden.

Geography

Education
Malden was the site of a ward school established by the Claude Independent School District in 1911. O.C. Shannon, who moved to the area from New Castle, Kentucky, was the school's first teacher. The building continued to operate until it joined with the schools in Claude in 1921. The students at the ward school became the first in the county to be bussed to schools in Claude, while others in the district followed in the 1920s. The building was then used as a community center and church. Malden continues to be served by the Claude ISD to this day.

References

Unincorporated communities in Armstrong County, Texas
Unincorporated communities in Texas
Unincorporated communities in Amarillo metropolitan area